Gauti Þeyr Másson, better known as Emmsjé Gauti (meaning "MC Gauti"; born 17 November 1989 in Akureyri), is an Icelandic rapper and hip hop artist with R&B and pop influences. He started his rapping career in 2002 and was member of Icelandic rap groups 32c and Skábræður before going solo starting 2010 and releasing two albums Bara ég in 2011 and Þeyr in 2013 with "Kinky" as the first single from Þeyr. The music video was produced by Redd Lights.

He has also cooperated with a great number of local artists including Erpur, Dabbi T, Fire in the booth, Gnúsi Yones, IntroBeats, Diddi Fel, Jói Dagur, Úlfur Úlfur, Aron Can, Friðrik Dór, Berndsen, 7berg, Séra Bjössi and others.

Personal life
Gauti studied graphic arts at Iðnskólinn (the Technical College). He appeared in an episode of the reality series Og Hvað where he was featured alongside Davíð Oddgeirsson. He is credited with the role of "Glow Stick Guy" in 2014 Icelandic film Land Ho! directed by Aaron Katz and Martha Stephens. He appeared in six episodes of the third season of Ófærð as the character Úlfur.

Discography

Albums
 2011: Bara ég
 2013: Þeyr
 2016: vagg&velta
 2016: Sautjándi nóvember
 2018: Fimm
 2020: Bleikt Ský
 2021: Mold (with Helgi Sæmundur)

Mixtapes
Freyðibað með Emmsjé Gauta

Singles
 2010: "Fyrirmynd"
 2011: "Hemmi Gunn" (feat. Blazroca)
 2011: "Dusta rykið"
 2011: "Okkar leið" (feat. Friðrik Dór)
 2011: "Sex Stafir" (feat. Hlynur)
 2012: "Einar" (feat. Helgi Sæmundur)
 2013: "Kinky"
 2013: "Litalaus" (feat. Unnsteinn Manuel)
 2013: "Hvolpaást" (feat. Unnsteinn Manuel & Larry BRD)
 2014: "Nýju fötin keisarans"
 2015: "Í Kvöld" (with Friðrik Dór)
 2015: "Strákarnir"
 2015: "Ómar Ragnarsson"
 2016: "Djammæli"
 2017: "Hógvær"
 2018: "Lágmulinn" (feat. Birnir)
 2018: "Eins og ég" 
 2019: "Saman" (feat. Floni)
 2019: "Án Djóks"
 2019: "Aloe Vera" (feat. Huginn)
 2019: "Malbik" (feat. Króli)
 2020: "Bleikt Ský"
 2020: "Vandamál" (feat. Birnir)
 2021: "Heim" (with Helgi Sæmundur)
 2021: "Tossi" (with Helgi Sæmundur)
 2021: "Pabbi" (with Helgi Sæmundur)

Featured in 
 2011: "Gleymmérei" (Gabríel feat. Emmsjé Gauti & Björn Jörundur)
 2011: "Það er komið sumar" <small> (Margrét & Ragga ft. Emmsjé Gauti)

References

External links

 Official website
 Facebook

Icelandic rappers
Icelandic musicians
1989 births
Living people